Geoffrey Webber is a musician and academic, and the former Director of Music at Gonville and Caius College, Cambridge.

Webber was a chorister at Salisbury Cathedral, and was educated at the King's School Worcester and New College, Oxford, where he was awarded an organ scholarship in 1977. He wrote his doctoral thesis on the organ music of Dietrich Buxtehude.

He was appointed Assisting Organist of Magdalen College, Oxford, in 1982, and University Organist and Director of Music at the University Church in 1984. In 1989 he was appointed Precentor and Director of Music at Gonville and Caius College, Cambridge, serving until his resignation due to inappropriate behaviour in April 2019.

Webber's publications include North German Church Music in the Age of Buxtehude (1996), the Cambridge Companion to the Organ (1998, as co-editor), and The Restoration Anthem (2003).

Works

His works include:

 1995 Puccini, Janáček, Geoffrey Webber - Requiem - Mass In E Flat (CD, Album) ASV Digital, CD DCA 914			
 1999 Bach - The Cambridge Baroque Camerata*, Geoffrey Webber - St Mark Passion (2xCD)	ASV, Gaudeamus	CD GAX 237
 1999 Samuel Wesley, Geoffrey Webber – Sacred Choral Music (CD, Album) ASV, CD GAU 157
 2011 Geoffrey Webber - In Dulci Jubilo (CD, Album) BBC Music Magazine BBC MM339, Vol. 20 No.3			
 2013 Geoffrey Webber, with Choir of King's College London - David Trendell - Deutsche Motette (German Romantic Choral Music From Schubert To Strauss) (CD) Delphian DCD34124		
 2014 Geoffrey Webber & Barnaby Brown - In Praise Of Saint Columba: The Sound World Of The Celtic Church (CD, Album)	Delphian DCD34137	
 2017 Geoffrey Webber, Barnaby Brown, Bill Taylor (20), John & Patrick Kenny - Set Upon The Rood: New Music For Choir & Ancient Instruments (CD, Album)	Delphian DCD34154
 2018 Julian Anderson, Geoffrey Webber – Choral Music (CD, Album) Delphian DCD34202

References

Living people
Year of birth missing (living people)
People educated at King's School, Worcester
Alumni of New College, Oxford
Members of the University of Cambridge Faculty of Music
English classical organists